Bijith Bala (also spelt BijithBala; born 29 May 1980) is an Indian film director/editor, who has worked predominantly in Indian movie industry. Bijith has worked in movies like Vellam, Nellikka, Shutter, and Dug Dug. His editing career has included various languages.

Career

Bijith began as a graphical designer in 2003. His first movie as a visual effect artist was Ente Veedu Appuvinteyum in 2003. Following that he worked in around 10 movies as a visual effects artist. In 2007 he moved to film editing field. He has many super hits in his editing career. In 2012 he worked as an associated director for the movie Shutter. In 2015 he has his directorial debut Nellikka. The movie was a musical family entertainer. In 2018 he has moved to Bollywood and did the editing work for Rocketry: The Nambi Effect.  Later he has worked in his second bollywood movie Dug Dug, which is directed by Ritwik Pareek and has selected in Toronto International Film Festival in 2021. He went on to make his debut asa director in Padachone Ingalu Katholee, an absolute trainwreck of a movie that offends common sense.

Personal life

Hails from Calicut Bijith was born to Balachandran, and Rajalakshmi. He married Simi S Nair and they have a daughter, Anmaya Bijith.

Filmography

As a visual Media artist

As a trailer editor

As an editor

As a Director

Awards, nominations and recognitions

Film festival

Official Selection on Toronto International Film Festival'2021 – Dug Dug

References

External links
 

Living people
Malayalam film directors
Malayali people
Malayalam film editors
People from Kozhikode
1980 births